Raymond Lucian Mallouf (July 11, 1918 – June 6, 2008) was an American football quarterback and punter who played professionally in the National Football League (NFL). He was a part of the Chicago Cardinals' NFL championship team in 1947. Mallouf was the first quarterback in NFL history to achieve a perfect passer rating of 158.3 in a game when he led Chicago to a 63-35 victory over the New York Giants in 1948.

References

External links

 

1918 births
2008 deaths
American football punters
American football quarterbacks
Chicago Cardinals players
New York Giants players
SMU Mustangs football players
People from Sayre, Oklahoma
Players of American football from Oklahoma
United States Navy personnel of World War II